Savica may refer to:

 Savica, Bohinj, a settlement in northwestern Slovenia
 Savica, Zagreb, a neighbourhood of Zagreb, Croatia
 Savica River, in northwestern Slovenia
 Savica (waterfall), a waterfall on the river
 Savica Mrkić (born 1991), Macedonian handball player
 Adam Savić (born 1986), Bosnian handball player

See also
 
 Savić, a surname
 Savita (disambiguation)